KBZO-LD (channel 51) is a low-power television station licensed to Lubbock, Texas, United States, affiliated with Univision. Owned by Entravision Communications, the station maintains studios on Caprock Drive in Lubbock and a transmitter on University Avenue (at the American Tower owned KLBK/KAMC tower) just outside Loop 289.

Digital channels
The station's digital signal is multiplexed:

External links
 
 

Television stations in Lubbock, Texas
Univision network affiliates
Spanish-language television stations in Texas
Low-power television stations in the United States
Entravision Communications stations
Television channels and stations established in 1989
1989 establishments in Texas